Yastin Fabiola Jiménez Donoso (born 17 October 2000) is a Chilean footballer who plays as a midfielder for Colo-Colo and the Chile women's national team.

International career
Jiménez made her senior debut for Chile on 29 August 2019 in a 1–0 friendly win against Costa Rica.

References 

2000 births
Living people
Women's association football midfielders
Chilean women's footballers
Footballers from Santiago
Chile women's international footballers
Colo-Colo (women) footballers
Footballers at the 2020 Summer Olympics
Olympic footballers of Chile